Henry Nyambe Mulenga (born 27 August 1987 in Chingola) is a Zambian former footballer.

Career 
Nyambe Mulenga started his career for Forest Rangers, before signed in December 2007 for  ZESCO United F.C. In April 2014 left ZESCO United F.C. and joined to League rival Power Dynamos F.C. on a season long loan deal.

He last played in the defence for ZESCO United F.C. in the Zambian Premier League, before on 20 January 2017 retired.

Career
Mulenga was part of the Zambian U-20 side which made the quarterfinals of the 2007 FIFA U-20 World Cup in Canada. He is a physical central defender, supported by the notion he was suspended for two of the four games Zambian played in the tournament, due to red card accumulation.

In December 2014 he was involved in a road accident, breaking his leg.

Honours

National Team
Zambia
Africa Cup of Nations: 2012

Notes and references

External links
2007 Zambia results

1987 births
Living people
Zambia international footballers
Zambian footballers
2012 Africa Cup of Nations players
Africa Cup of Nations-winning players
ZESCO United F.C. players
Association football defenders
Forest Rangers F.C. players
Zambia A' international footballers
2009 African Nations Championship players